The 1982–83 season was the 37th season in Rijeka’s history and their 21st season in the Yugoslav First League. Their 12th place finish in the 1981–82 season meant it was their ninth successive season playing in the Yugoslav First League.

Competitions

Yugoslav First League

Classification

Results summary

Results by round

Matches

First League

Source: rsssf.com

Yugoslav Cup

Source: rsssf.com

Squad statistics
Competitive matches only.  Appearances in brackets indicate numbers of times the player came on as a substitute.

See also
1982–83 Yugoslav First League
1982–83 Yugoslav Cup

References

External sources
 1982–83 Yugoslav First League at rsssf.com
 Prvenstvo 1982.-83. at nk-rijeka.hr

HNK Rijeka seasons
Rijeka